Karen Simpson (born August 28, 1967) is an American politician who is a member of the Maryland House of Delegates for District 3 in Frederick County, Maryland.

Background
Simpson graduated from Paint Branch High School in 1985. She later attended Radford University, where she earned a Bachelor of Arts degree in psychology in 1989, and Towson University, where she earned a Master of Arts degree in community counseling in 1996.

In the legislature
Simpson was sworn into the Maryland House of Delegates on January 11, 2023, with the start of the Maryland General Assembly's 445th legislative session. She is a member of the House Judiciary Committee.

Political positions
In May 2022, Simpson signed a Chesapeake Climate Action Network resolution to move Maryland to 100 percent carbon-free electricity by 2035 and to remove trash incineration from the state's "clean energy" classification.

In a September 2022 interview with The Frederick News-Post, Simpson said she would support strengthening protections for domestic violence victims, including removing the statute of limitations on reporting workplace sexual harassment and creating a state registry for people convicted of domestic violence-related offenses.

Electoral history

References

External links
 

1967 births
21st-century American politicians
21st-century American women politicians
Democratic Party members of the Maryland House of Delegates
Living people
People from Baltimore
Radford University alumni
Towson University alumni
Women state legislators in Maryland